Loco is a village in Stephens County, Oklahoma, United States. The population was 150 at the 2000 census.

Etymology
Two theories exist as to how Loco acquired its name. One theory, popularized by the Oklahoma Department of Transportation, states that the community was named for locoweed found in the area. The second theory, proposed by the niece of founder Albert G. Cranfill, suggests the name came from the Latin locus. It has frequently been noted on lists of unusual place names.

Geography
Loco is located at  (34.328533, -97.680538).

Demographics

As of the census of 2000, there were 150 people, 67 households, and 44 families residing in the town. There were 82 housing units at an average density of 312.4 per square mile (121.8/km2). The racial makeup of the town was 87.33% White, 8.00% Native American, and 4.67% from two or more races.

There were 67 households, out of which 22.4% had children under the age of 18 living with them, 50.7% were married couples living together, 9.0% had a female householder with no husband present, and 34.3% were non-families. 28.4% of all households were made up of individuals, and 17.9% had someone living alone who was 65 years of age or older. The average household size was 2.24 and the average family size was 2.68.

The village's population was spread out, with 19.3% under the age of 18, 6.0% from 18 to 24, 24.7% from 25 to 44, 32.0% from 45 to 64, and 18.0% who were 65 years of age or older. The median age was 45 years. For every 100 females, there were 100.0 males. For every 100 females age 18 and over, there were 98.4 males.

The median income for a household in Loco was $19,375, and the median income for a family was $30,000. Males had a median income of $30,000 versus $20,357 for females. The per capita income for the town was $11,440. There were 10.0% of families and 16.8% of the population living below the poverty line, including 19.4% of under eighteens and 41.7% of those over 64.

Notable residents 
 Robert McMurtry (1950–2012), author, painter

References

Towns in Stephens County, Oklahoma
Towns in Oklahoma